William Walls (1819–1893) was a Scottish lawyer, industrialist and Dean of Guild of Glasgow.

William Walls may also refer to:
William H. Walls (1932–2019), United States federal judge
William Andrew Walls (1859–1936), Scottish rugby union player
Bill Walls (1914–1993), American football player

See also
William Wall (disambiguation)
William Wales (disambiguation)